Anchik is a rural locality (a selo) and the administrative centre of Anchiksky Selsoviet, Akhvakhsky District, Republic of Dagestan, Russia. The population was 819 as of 2010. There are 2 streets.

Geography 
Anchik is located 10 km northwest of Karata (the district's administrative centre) by road. Rachabulda is the nearest rural locality.

References 

Rural localities in Akhvakhsky District